Crime in Afghanistan is present in various forms, and includes the following: corruption, contract killings or assassinations, bombings, kidnapping, drug trafficking, money laundering, black marketeering, and ordinary crimes such as theft and assault.

Opium cultivation

Opium poppy cultivation and drug trafficking have important role in the political and economic situation of Afghanistan for last twenty-five years. In the aftermath of the Soviet withdrawal from Afghanistan, opium poppy cultivation increased in the nation. Many mujahideen commanders taxed opium poppy cultivation, even directly participated in illicit drug trade for military financing. Although the Taliban condemned cultivation of narcotic substances, requirements of money encouraged toleration and taxation of drug cultivation. In 1999, Afghanistan produced a peak of over 4,581 metric tons of raw and refined opium. This led to increasing international pressure from states having consumer population of Afghan drugs. In response, the Taliban banned opium poppy cultivation in late 2000, but allowed the opium trade to continue. Under the ban, opium poppy cultivation was reduced to 185 metric tons. This little production of opium continued in areas under the control of the United Islamic Front for the Salvation of Afghanistan.

Since the downfall of the Taliban in 2001, cultivation and trafficking of opium has increased significantly. Throughout the country regional militia commanders, criminal organizations and corrupt government officials have engaged in drug trafficking as a source of revenue. Some anti-government groups make profit from the drug trafficking. Due to these factors, drug trafficking increases political instability in the nation, and is a threat to the country's weak internal security and embryonic democratic government.

Afghanistan is the world's largest producer of opium and in 2001, Afghanistan was the source of 87% of the world's illicit opium. 80-90% of the heroin consumed in Europe comes from opium produced in Afghanistan. According to Antonio Maria Costa "drugs are now a clear and present danger" in Afghanistan. According to a survey in 2007 by United Nations Office on Drugs and Crime, 93% of the opiates on the world market originated in Afghanistan.

Social conditions

Unemployment among a large portion of the population and rudimentary basic services are major factors behind crime. Other forms of crime include robbery as well as kidnappings and assault. Many riots have occurred in the country in response to various political and other issues.

Kabul

Since the downfall of the Taliban, the crime rate has significantly increased in the capital city Kabul. Armed robberies are regularly reported in the western districts of Kabul. Between March 2002 and January 2003, 48 cases of homicide, 80 cases of theft and 12 cases of kidnappings were reported within Kabul municipal boundaries.

Terrorism

Terrorist attacks, including mass shootings and suicide bombings, have occurred many times since the 2001 invasion of Afghanistan. They are carried out by the Taliban and the Islamic State of Iraq and the Levant – Khorasan Province.

See also

 Alcohol in Afghanistan
 Corruption in Afghanistan
 Law enforcement in Afghanistan
 Law of Afghanistan

References